Mark Alan Miller is the Vice President of Seraphim, Inc., Clive Barker's production company. Miller is also a comic book writer, having written for Boom! Studios and Dark Horse.

Credits

References

External links
Official website

British businesspeople
British cartoonists
Living people
Year of birth missing (living people)